Centanafadine (INN) (former developmental code name EB-1020) is a serotonin-norepinephrine-dopamine reuptake inhibitor (SNDRI) that began its development with Euthymics Bioscience after they acquired DOV Pharmaceutical. It was developed as a treatment for attention-deficit hyperactivity disorder (ADHD) and inhibits the reuptake of norepinephrine, dopamine, and serotonin with a ratio of 1:6:14, respectively. In 2011, Euthymics Bioscience spun off its development of centanafadine to a new company called Neurovance. In March 2017, Otsuka Pharmaceutical acquired Neurovance and the rights to centanafadine. As of January 2018, Otsuka's pipeline indicates it is in Phase III clinical trials.

See also 
 Amitifadine
 Bicifadine
 Dasotraline
 DOV-216,303
 Tesofensine

References

External links 
 Centanafadine - AdisInsight

2-Naphthyl compounds
Serotonin–norepinephrine–dopamine reuptake inhibitors
Stimulants
Nitrogen heterocycles
Cyclopropanes